Ecyroschema multituberculatum is a species of beetle in the family Cerambycidae. It was described by Stephan von Breuning in 1942. It is known from South Africa.

References

Crossotini
Beetles described in 1942